was a Japanese football player. He played for Japan national team.

Club career
Suzuki was born in Kanagawa Prefecture on 30 April 1913. He played for Waseda WMW was consisted of his alma mater Waseda University players and graduates. At this club, he played many Japan national team players Motoo Tatsuhara, Tadao Horie and so on.

National team career
In May 1934, when Suzuki was a Waseda University student, he was selected Japan national team for 1934 Far Eastern Championship Games in Manila. At this competition, on 15 May, he debuted against Philippines. In 1936, he was selected Japan for 1936 Summer Olympics in Berlin. Japan completed a come-from-behind victory first match against Sweden. The first victory in Olympics for the Japan and the historic victory over one of the powerhouses became later known as "Miracle of Berlin" (ベルリンの奇跡) in Japan. In 2016, this team was selected Japan Football Hall of Fame. He did not play in against Sweden. However, he played next match against Italy instead of Tadao Horie fractured his right arm. He played 2 games for Japan until 1936.

National team statistics

References

External links

 
 Japan National Football Team Database
Japan Football Hall of Fame (Japan team at 1936 Olympics) at Japan Football Association
 Yasuo Suzuki's profile at Sports Reference.com

1913 births
Year of death missing
Waseda University alumni
Association football people from Kanagawa Prefecture
Japanese footballers
Japan international footballers
Olympic footballers of Japan
Footballers at the 1936 Summer Olympics
Association football defenders